Mairé is a commune in the Vienne department in the Nouvelle-Aquitaine region in western France. (Not to be confused with Mairé-Levescault, in the same general area).

Demographics

See also
Communes of the Vienne department

References

Communes of Vienne